The Last Defense is an American documentary series that explores and exposes flaws in the American justice system through emotional, in-depth examinations. The program ran for one season on the ABC television network during the summer of 2018.

The first season examines the death row cases of Darlie Routier and Julius Jones and seeks to trace the path that led both Routier and Jones to their places on death row, while taking a deep look into their personal stories. Jones' sentence has since been commuted to life without parole while Routier remains on death row.

Episodes

References

American Broadcasting Company original programming
2018 American television series debuts
2010s American documentary television series
English-language television shows
True crime television series
2018 American television series endings